The Oder is a river in Central Europe.

Oder or variation, may also refer to:

 Glenn Oder (born 1957), U.S. politician
 Tjaša Oder (born 1994), Slovenian swimmer
 Oder Dam, a dam in Germany on the river Oder
 Oder Lagoon, Baltic Sea; in Germany and Poland
 Oder (Harz), Lower Saxony, Germany; a river
 Oder Valley Railway, Germany
 Overdoser (ODer), someone who has had a drug overdose
 Online dater (ODer), someone participating in online dating
 Oder, someone who composes odes

See also

 Odour/Odor
 
 Ode (disambiguation)
 Odes (disambiguation)
 OD (disambiguation)
 Odor (disambiguation)